The Egypt women's national artistic gymnastics team represents Egypt in FIG international competitions.

History
Egypt has never fielded a team at the Olympic Games.  Sherine El-Zeiny became the first female Egyptian artistic gymnast to compete at the Olympic Games, doing so in 2008.  Since then Egypt has had at least one female gymnast compete at each Olympic Games.

Team competition results

World Championships
 2014 – 36th place
Rana El-Bialy, Miriam Fouad, Rowan Hazem, Fadwa Mahmoud, Nancy Taman, Malak Zaghiloul
 2018 – 25th place
Farah Hussein, Mandy Mohamed, Farah Salem, Nancy Taman
 2019 – 24th place
Farah Hussein, Zeina Ibrahim, Mandy Mohamed, Farah Salem, Nancy Taman
 2022 – 22nd place
 Jana Abdelsalam, Jana Aboelhasan, Zeina Ibrahim, Nancy Taman

Junior World Championships
 2019 – 24th
Jana Aboelhasan, Jana Mahmoud, Salma Melige

Senior roster

See also 
 List of Olympic female artistic gymnasts for Egypt

References

Gymnastics in Egypt
National women's artistic gymnastics teams
Gymnastics